Frank Pipp (born May 22, 1977, in Iron Mountain, Michigan) is a former American cyclist. He was professional from 2005 to 2013.

Palmarès
2004
2nd stage of the Joe Martin Stage Race

2006
3rd stage of the International Tour de Toona

2007
6th stage of the Nature Valley Grand Prix

2011
2nd stage of the Tour of the Gila
General classification of the Joe Martin Stage Race

2012
2nd of the United States National Road Race Championships

References

Further reading
 "NRC standings: Pipp and Keough big movers." Cycling News. May 10, 2011. Race: Joe Martin Stage Race p/b Nature Valley
 Mark Zalewski, North American Editor. "Health Net-Maxxis keeps strong core for 2008." Cycling News. December 1, 2007.
 Mark Zalewski North American Editor. "O'Bee's second stars and stripes earned the hard way." Cycling News. August 21, 2007.

External links
 Frank Pipp, USA Cycling

1977 births
Living people
American male cyclists